Robert Beverley Evans, Sr. (March 19, 1906 – August 17, 1998) was an automobile industry executive, a prominent Republican, an industrialist, a socialite, and an avid sportsperson. He founded Evans Industries. Evans also became chairman of American Motors Corporation (AMC).

Career
Evans was born in Richmond, Virginia, and graduated from the Virginia Episcopal School, The University of Lauzon, and the University of Michigan.

As an entrepreneur, Evans became the owner of many companies with combined annual sales of US$20 million by the 1960s, but entrusted most business affairs to underlings. Instead, Evans focused his efforts on hobbies like golf, quail hunting, as well as designing and racing a hydroplane. He built a jet-powered hydroplane in 1960 with the goal to capture the world's water speed record that was held by Donald Campbell. He was determined to succeed even when his boat, "Miss Stars and Stripes II", crashed during a speed attempt.

The Evans Products Company grew into a supplier of automotive transportation systems and building materials. In 1955, Evans Products spun off several small companies to Robert B. Evans, Jr., the executive vice president, and son of the founder. The resulting companies became managed as a private equity firm, Evans Industries.

Evans described himself in a New York Times interview as a relaxed Detroit millionaire who has spent 35 years specializing in the reconstruction of "sick companies."

American Motors 
Investors received AMC's annual report that reported significant losses in a plain brown envelope and Evans was called by Donald MacDonald, "a little-known Detroit healer of sick companies." Over a few weeks during January 1966, the sixty-year-old Evans bought 200,000 shares of AMC common stock (worth almost US$2 million or about $ in  dollars ). He became the firm's largest shareholder, with ownership of about 1% of the company.

Evans had no automobile industry experience, but "he had a reputation for success and for getting things done." On March 7, 1966, Evans got himself elected to AMC's board of directors and "immediately criticized the company's auto line as being too conservative." As sales of automobiles were weak industry-wide during 1966 and AMC was facing major losses, Evans was elected board chairman by AMC's directors on June 6, 1966. He replaced Richard E. Cross, who continued as a director and chairman of the executive committee.

As the newly appointed board chairman of AMC, Evans immediately promised "a different philosophy and approach" in the automaker's affairs. Unlike the then existing management at AMC, Evans freely criticized the leadership under George W. Romney "for failing to adjust to a changing market" and started to "shake things up in Kenosha" as solutions to the automaker's problems.

Evans is credited with turning the company around from the strategy of matching the Big Three American automakers (General Motors, Ford, and Chrysler) nearly model for model that was promoted by Roy Abernethy. American Motors' struggled during 1966, a year that was considered to be "the biggest auto boom in history" and was counting on its redesigned 1967 models; however, Evans admitted one month before their introduction that "we are still very much in a questionable period."

It was Evans who brought on the major changes by handpicking Roy D. Chapin Jr. as AMC's general manager. Evans was always encouraging the styling and engineering staff to do things differently - to try new ideas and find new ways to design and build cars. Evans even dropped hints that the automaker may try to compete with Volkswagen in the small-car field and stated that "We have to give the public cars that go beyond what the 'big three' gives them." In addition to stating that AMC's standard line of cars need to be as good or better than those offered by the bigger automakers, Evans emphasized developing "Personality cars" to attract and excite market segments, particularly the youth.

Evans is credited as the champion for AMC to build a production versions of the concept cars that made up the "Project IV" showings designed to stimulate public interest in the automaker. Evans was particularly fond of the two-seat Vignale AMX show car that was smaller than the Ford Mustang and more like a Chevrolet Corvette rival, promoting for its production to all that he could. This was at a time when the automaker experienced falling earnings and had to skip the dividend payments to its shareholders for the fourth consecutive quarter.

Evans saw opportunities for sporty AMC cars in the rapidly growing more youthful consumer market segments, as well as to shed its "economy-car image." The original idea of a two-passenger-only, high-performance sports car project came to life with Evans in the fall of 1966. He stated that AMC is proceeding "cautiously in a hurry." For example, the automaker was deliberating whether to build the AMX in fiberglass or steel; with metal taking longer to tool, but volume would be higher.

On January 9, 1967, a contentious AMC board of directors meeting resulted in the firing or "early retirement" of Abernethy, as well as with the "resignation" of Evans as chairman of the board. The two were replaced by William V. Luneburg as president and Roy D. Chapin Jr. as the new chairman of the board. Evans continued as a board member.

Retirement 
During May 1970, Evans sold half of his holdings in AMC (100,000 shares). Evans sold 44,000 of his AMC shares in 1971 while continuing to serve as a director and member of the finance committee.

In 1971, Evans purchased the Muskegon Bank and Trust Company in Muskegon, Michigan from the so-called "Parsons Group".

He died at his residence in Grosse Pointe Shores, Michigan. He was survived by his two children, Jane Evans Jones and Robert B. Evans, Jr.

References 

American chief executives in the automobile industry
American Motors people
1906 births
1998 deaths
University of Michigan alumni
Michigan Republicans
20th-century American businesspeople
People from Grosse Pointe Shores, Michigan